This is a list of notable people who were considered deities by themselves or others.

Imperial cults and cults of personality

Posthumous deification

Involuntary deification

Self-deification

See also

 Advaita Vedanta
 Apotheosis
 Arahitogami
 Brahman
 Christ myth theory
 Cult of personality
 Culture hero
 Divinity#Mortals
 Divinization (Christian)
 Euhemerism
 Folk saint
 God complex
 God in Hinduism
 Godman (Hindu ascetic)
 Hero cult
 Idolatry
 Imperial cult
 Incarnation
 List of avatar claimants
 List of Buddha claimants
 List of deities
 List of demigods
 List of Mahdi claimants
 List of messiah claimants
 List of people claimed to be Jesus
 Mahāvākyas
 Maitreya claimants
 Messiah complex
 Religion in ancient Rome
 Sacred king
 Shaktyavesha Avatar
 Tat Tvam Asi
 "Thou Art God"
 Veneration of the dead

References

Lists of deities
Lists of religious figures
Religion-related lists